The Virginia Cyber Range is an educational and research institute funded by a $4-million grant from the Commonwealth of Virginia to promote education in cybersecurity across the state. Currently, the Cyber Range is based out of the Virginia Tech Corporate Research Center.

History 
The idea of a cyber range for education in cybersecurity in Virginia was first proposed by Governor Terry McAuliffe in late 2015. The 2017 - 2018 Commonwealth of Virginia Biennial Budget provided initial funding for the Virginia Cyber Range. Specifically, $4 million over two years was "designated to support a cyber range platform to be used for cyber security training by students in Virginia's public high schools, community colleges, and four-year institutions," with Virginia Tech identified as the lead agency for the cyber range platform.  

The Virginia Cyber Range was initially funded on July 1, 2016 with David Raymond selected as the Director, and in February 2017, named Amazon Web Services as a primary partner in the design of the Cyber Range.

As of early 2019, the Cyber Range supports over 200 high schools, colleges, and universities in Virginia with infrastructure and courseware for cybersecurity classes and clubs.  It also supports the annual Virginia CyberFusion Cyber Cup competition. The Virginia Cyber Range hosted the Inaugural Virginia Cybersecurity Education Conference at James Madison University in August 2018. The second annual Virginia Cybersecurity Education Conference took place on George Mason University's Fairfax campus in August 2019. In July 2019, the Cyber Range expanded
its services beyond the Commonwealth of Virginia by launching the US Cyber Range. This courseware is offered as a service center of Virginia Tech

References 

Cyber ranges
Virginia Tech